This is a list of Azerbaijani regions by Human Development Index as of 2021. This also includes Baku, the capital and largest city, but excludes the Nakhchivan Autonomous Republic and Kalbajar-Lachin.

Nakhchivan Autonomous Republic
Nakhchivan enjoys a high Human Development Index; its socio-economic prowess far exceeds that of Azerbaijan itself. According to the report of Nakhchivan AR Committee of Statistics on June 30, 2018 for the end of 2017, some socio-economical data, including the following, are unveiled:

Making use of the Human Development Index calculation method according to the new UNHD 2014 method, the above values change into these:

References 

Azerbaijan
Human Development Index
Regions By Human Development Index